N-acylglucosamine 2-epimerase is an enzyme that in humans is encoded by the RENBP gene.

The gene product inhibits renin activity by forming a dimer with renin, a complex known as high molecular weight renin. The encoded protein contains a leucine zipper domain, which is essential for its dimerization with renin. The gene product can catalyze the interconversion of N-acetylglucosamine to N-acetylmannosamine, indicating that it is a GlcNAc 2-epimerase. Transcript variants utilizing alternative promoters have been described in the literature.

References

Further reading